Josie Sedgwick (March 13, 1899 – April 30, 1973) was an American film actress. She appeared in more than 50 films from 1914 to 1932.

Her brother was actor/director Edward Sedgwick, and her sister was actress Eileen Sedgwick.

Filmography

References

External links

 

1899 births
1973 deaths
People from Galveston, Texas
American film actresses
20th-century American actresses
Burials at Holy Cross Cemetery, Culver City